The 1987 RTHK Top 10 Gold Songs Awards was held in 1987 for the 1986 music season.

Top 10 song awards
The top 10 songs (十大中文金曲) of 1987 are as follows.

Other awards

References
 RTHK top 10 gold song awards 1987

RTHK Top 10 Gold Songs Awards
Rthk Top 10 Gold Songs Awards, 1987
Rthk Top 10 Gold Songs Awards, 1987